The Apostolic Prefecture of Cubango in Angola was an exempt Latin Catholic missionary pre-diocesan jurisdiction in present Angola.

History 
 Established on 3 July 1879 as Apostolic Prefecture of Cimbebasia, on territory split off from the then Apostolic Vicariate of Two Guineas
 Lost territory in 1881 to establish the Mission sui juris of Cunene
 Renamed on 1 August 1892 as Apostolic Prefecture of Upper Cimbebasia in Portuguese Angola (Curiate Italian: Cimbebasia Superiore), having lost territory to establish the Apostolic Prefecture of Lower Cimbebasia
 Renamed on 10 January 1921 as Apostolic Prefecture of Cubango in Angola
 Suppressed on 4 September 1940, its territory being reassigned to establish the Roman Catholic Diocese of Nova Lisboa, to which its incumbent was promoted as first Bishop.

Ordinaries 
Apostolic Prefect of Upper Cimbebasia in Portuguese Angola
 Alfredo Ludovico Keiling, C.S.Sp. (1909.11.16 – 1921.01.10)

Apostolic Prefects of Cubango in Angola
 Alfredo Ludovico Keiling, C.S.Sp. (10 January 1921 – 30 November 1937)
 Daniel Gomes Junqueira, C.S.Sp. (10 June 1938 – 28 January 1941), later first Bishop of Nova Lisboa (Angola) (28 January 1941 – death 29 June 1970)

See also
Roman Catholicism in Angola

References

Sources and external links
 GCatholic

1940 disestablishments
Christian organizations established in 1921
Apostolic prefectures
Former Roman Catholic dioceses in Africa